Kirana Bar forms part of the Bar Region in Pakistani Punjab. It is a portion of the Jech Doab, and it takes its name from the Kirana Hills found here. It convers the area between the western side of Chenab and the eastern side of Jehlum.

The hills are not, as generally supposed, outliers of the Salt Range This region is divided between the Sargodha and Jhang districts of Punjab, Pakistan. Bar stands for an area of jungle as it was before colonisation by the British Government.
This area starts from the northwest of Hissár country near the bank of river Chenab with an abrupt high ridge and this high bank of bar dies away a little distance east of the boundary of between the Chiniot and Jhang tehsils, opposite the village of Kot Mohla.
The lands of the Kirana Bár to the east and south of the hills are of superb quality. After slight showers of rain, the whole land is carpeted with grass. Better rain crops are grown here than in the Sandal Bar. To the west of Kirana and westwards until the villages near the River Jhelum are reached, the bar soil deteriorates, and more and more kallar is found. The Kirana bár is demarcated from the Utár by the same fall or slope as the Sandal Bar. Generally this ledge forms the boundary between the villages and Government waste. But few villages possess lands beyond the high bank, or Nakka as it is called. The flora of this Bár is much the same as that of the Sándal. Sajjí is produced to the south west of Kirána. Some peculiar grasses grow on and near the hills, that are held to be of most excellent quality.

See also
 Sandal Bar
 Mountain ranges of Pakistan
 List of mountains in Pakistan

References

Landforms of Punjab (Pakistan)